Kastelic is a Slovenian surname. Notable people with the surname include:

Andrej Kastelic (born 1971), Slovenian handball player
Ed Kastelic (born 1964), Canadian ice hockey player
Janko Kastelic (born 1969), Canadian-Slovenian conductor
Mark Kastelic, (born 1999), ice hockey player

Slovene-language surnames